FourFourTwo is a football magazine published by Future. Issued monthly, it published its 300th edition in May 2019. It takes its name from the football formation of the same name, 4-4-2.

In 2008, it was announced that FourFourTwo had entered into a three-year shirt sponsorship deal with Swindon Town, which commenced in the 2008–09 season.

Although based in the United Kingdom, the magazine is also available in 16 other languages.

Contributors

Present
The following people are amongst the regular contributors to FourFourTwo (UK edition):
Uli Hesse
James Horncastle
Martin Mazur
Michael Cox

Past columnists
James Richardson, who presents the European Football Show on BT Sport and previously Football Italia on Channel 4, who used to give his views on Italian football before being replaced.
Henry Winter — Leading football journalist.
Brian Clough — Ex-player and manager, until his death in 2004.
Bobby Robson — Ex-player and manager who briefly replaced Brian Clough.
Stan Bowles — The ex-Queens Park Rangers and England player, who wrote an anecdotal column.
Robbie Savage — The former Wales midfielder, who wrote about the game from a current Premiership footballer's perspective.
Sam Allardyce — Ex-Newcastle United manager who answered readers' questions.
David Platt — who wrote columns discussing tactics for particular matches or teams.
Michel Salgado, footballer formerly of Real Madrid and Blackburn Rovers.
Arsène Wenger — Arsenal manager. FourFourTwo's 5-a-side "guru" who is questioned by two people every month and gives tips on the 5-a-side game.
Diego Forlán, Internacional striker.
The Player, a mystery columnist, with an article each month. His anonymity allows him to write about the unseen aspects of football - drink, drugs, mistresses, etc..

Editors
Notable editors of FourFourTwo have included Mat Snow, Hugh Sleight and Hitesh Ratna. The founding editor was Karen Buchanan.

Content
The magazine is split up in the following sections: Upfront, Features, Action Replay and The Mixer.

Rankings and awards

FourFourTwo has a number of annual rankings and awards. In 2007, the magazine put together its first FFT100, a list of the 100 best footballers in the world - according to them. At the end of the 2012–13 Premier League season, FourFourTwo announced its first Stats Zone Awards. In May 2015, the inaugural list of the 50 best Asian players in world football was announced. They also do a top 50 of players from the Football League.

Greatest Player of the 21st Century 
In April 2022, FourFourTwo  magazine ranked the best footballers of the 21st century. Lionel Messi was ranked as number 1.

The 50 greatest Barcelona players of all time

The 50 greatest Real Madrid players of all time

Other editions

 Australian edition - FourFourTwo launched an Australian edition in October 2005, to coincide with the new A-League.

The launch publicity ran with the tagline of "It's footy, but not as you know it," a reference to the popularity of Australian rules football and rugby league and the fact that association football is referred to as soccer in Australia. This also referred to the launch slogan of the A-League: "It's football, but not as you know it" — part of the work Football Australia is doing to rebrand and relaunch the game. Further to this, the first edition's frontpage contained the motto "Goodbye Soccer, Hello Football." The current editor is Kevin Airs. The magazine closed in August 2018.

 Brazilian edition - First published in 2009, by Brazilian publishing company Cadiz.
 Bulgarian edition - First published in April 2010, having pre-World Cup information about the England national football team and coach Fabio Capello for its cover story.
 Croatian edition - First published in October 2010.
 Dutch edition - First published in November 2018, by F&L Media
 Egyptian edition - First published in June 2010, by Egyptian publishing company Omedia.
 Hungarian edition - First published in March 2010.
 Indonesian edition - First published in 2009, by PT Tunas Bola.
 Italian edition - First published in December 2013. Editor Xavier Jacobelli.
 Korean edition - First published in June 2007, by Korean publishing company MediaWill. Articles on domestic football normally take up about half of the 190-pages.
 Malaysian/Singapore edition - In 2009, Measat publications took over the license of the Malaysian edition, which is also on sale in Singapore. On 11 August 2009, a weekly FourFourTwo TV Show began on affiliated television station, Astro SuperSport, hosted by former ESPN anchor Jason Dasey. There are now two weekly editions: FourFourTwo EuroZone and FourFourTwo EuroGoals, as well as a monthly version, FourFourTwo Performance.
 Nigerian edition - First published in 2006, relaunched May 2008 with Samm Audu as the editor. It is the biggest-selling soccer magazine in West Africa. It also sells in South Africa.
 Polish edition - First published in May 2010, by Arskom Group.
 Portuguese edition - First published in November 2013, by the company 'Goody S.A.'.
 Swedish edition - First published in April 2008.
 Thai edition - First published in November 2009, by Plus One Media Co., Ltd., on 3rd day of the month. Now, FourFourTwo are published by Siam Sport Syndicate Co.Ltd, on early of the month.
 Turkish edition - First published in April 2006.
 Vietnamese edition - First published in May 2010.

See also 

 World Soccer
 The Guardian
Onze Mondial 
European Sports Magazines

References

External links
Official website

Association football magazines
Sports magazines published in the United Kingdom
Football mass media in the United Kingdom
Monthly magazines published in the United Kingdom
Magazines established in 1994
1994 establishments in the United Kingdom
Magazines published in London